Shannon-Ogbnai Abeda (born 15 May 1996) is an Eritrean-Canadian alpine skier and Ski Cross athlete. Abeda competed for Eritrea at the 2018 Winter Olympics in the alpine skiing events. Abeda became the first athlete to compete for Eritrea at the Winter Olympics. He finished 61st in the Giant Slalom event and did not finish the first run of the Slalom event. Abeda's parents fled the Eritrean War of Independence in the 1980s and emigrated to Canada. Abeda also represented the country at the inaugural Winter Youth Olympics in 2012 in Innsbruck, Austria. Abeda announced his intentions to take the 2018/2019 season off and attend university after the 2018 Winter Olympic Games. He hinted that he would return for the 2022 Winter Olympics games, but also at the possibility of retirement. As of 2021, his FIS status indicates that he competed in two races in April 2021 confirming his return to Alpine. In September 2021, he confirmed his intentions to qualify for the 2022 Winter Olympic Games.
On December 21, 2021, Abeda qualified for the 2022 Winter Olympics; shortly after his event, he announced his retirement.

Early life
Abeda was born in Fort McMurray, Alberta, to Eritrean immigrants Walday Abeda and Ariam Abeda. His parents settled in Fort McMurray after his father received an entry-level engineering job. His father is a geological engineer who works in the Oil and Gas industry. He started skiing at the age three after his sister took a day trip to the local ski hill and convinced his parents to enroll his siblings into the team. Abeda and his brother wanted to try hockey, but his parents were reluctant and afraid of injuries that might occur. Abeda's family moved to Calgary in 2003 and he started to develop a passion for Alpine Skiing when he started training in the Rocky Mountains at Banff Sunshine. While Abeda enjoyed the different environment, it was not until he was ten years old that he thought about pursuing an Olympic Career when his coach TJ pushed him outside of his comfort zone. Subsequently, Abeda achieved high rankings in regional races and qualified for national events.

Career
In 2011, he decided to compete for Eritrea in the hopes of competing in the 2012 Youth Olympic games in Innsbruck, Austria. Having two parents of Eritrean descent, Abeda was granted Eritrean citizenship and a passport. He made his first international appearances in 2012 and competed in many regional races in the US and Canada. In 2014, he attempted to qualify for the 2014 Winter Olympics but missed the cut-off by four FIS points. He subsequently tried again and qualified for 2018 Winter Olympics. Abeda did not compete in an international event until 2018, when he returned to compete in South Korea. After the Olympics, Abeda took a year off to focus on his education and to elect a surgery to fix his jaw. Leading up to the Olympics in December 2017, Abeda partially fractured his jaw and lost two teeth in a training accident. He also sustained a significant injury while training in February 2016, tearing his anterior cruciate ligament and several other ligaments and partially fracturing his tibia. After two surgeries and a year of rehabilitation, he returned to competition in March 2017 and successfully met the qualification standards for the games. He planned to return to Alpine for the 2019/2020 season however decided to retire officially.

In July 2019, Abeda posted a video on his LinkedIn account showing him training in WinSport's ice house. He hinted at the possibility of switching to Bobsleigh for 2022. Later that month, he confirmed the switch and formally retired from Alpine Skiing. However, in 2021 it appeared that Abeda had returned to Alpine Skiing after his FIS status indicated that he competed in two races. In September 2021, he confirmed his return to Alpine. On December 21, 2021, Abeda secured a quota for the 2022 Winter Olympics. After the games, Abeda officially announced his retirement from Alpine Skiing on his social media however it appears that his FIS license is still active.

Personal life
Abeda is an avid weightlifter and coder. He dedicates most of his off-snow time to his training which includes an extensive amount of olympic weightlifting, boxing, running, and programming. Abeda is a strong advocate for Bulgarian-style training and heavy lifting. He credits Cory Gregory's SquatEveryDay program as the catalyst behind his training regiment and a vital tool that helped him rehabilitate his knee.  He is undertaking his studies at the University of Lethbridge double majoring in Computer Science and Business Administration.

After he failed to qualify for Sochi, Abeda was invited to a TedX conference where he discussed his struggles and his methodology to overcome his obstacles. He explained further why he failed to qualify and the toll it had on his physical, mental, and emotional well-being. Abeda also discussed the negative impact of attending the 2012 Youth Olympic games and how it damaged his morale and reputation.

His brother, Metawee, accompanied him to the games and walked into the opening stadium during the 2018 Winter Olympics opening ceremony.
Abeda's family also joined and stayed in the village with him to provide support. His father, Walday, was the chef de mission.

In May 2019, he returned to Eritrea for the Independence Day (Eritrea) to announce his candidacy to compete in 2022 with the goal of bringing another athlete along with him. He is working with the Eritrean National Olympic Committee to recruit athletes in the diaspora and build a future Winter Olympic team.

He resides and trains in Calgary for four months of the year, and for the remaining time, he lives in Lethbridge, where he attends university.

He attended and graduated from William Aberhart High School, where he received his French diploma.

See also

Eritrea at the 2012 Winter Youth Olympics
Eritrea at the 2018 Winter Olympics
Eritrea at the 2022 Winter Olympics

References

External links
Olympic.org athlete profile

1996 births
Eritrean male alpine skiers
Living people
Canadian people of Eritrean descent
People from Fort McMurray
Sportspeople from Alberta
Alpine skiers at the 2012 Winter Youth Olympics
Alpine skiers at the 2018 Winter Olympics
Alpine skiers at the 2022 Winter Olympics
Olympic alpine skiers of Eritrea